Rodrigo ‘Koxa’ Augusto do Espírito Santo  (born September 22, 1979) is a Brazilian professional big wave surfer and extreme waterman who broke the world record for largest wave ever surfed at Nazaré, Portugal, in November 8, 2017.

Biography
Rodrigo ‘Koxa’ Augusto do Espírito Santo was born in Jundiaí, Brazil on September 22, 1979, and began his surfing career in 1988 on the beaches of Guarujá, Brazil.

On April 30, 2018, Koxa won the coveted Quiksilver XXL Biggest Wave prize, in the Big Wave Awards of World Surf League (WSL). His wave was recognised by judges of the Santa Monica, CA-based Big Wave Awards as the biggest wave ever surfed in history. He now holds the position in the Guinness World Records with the biggest wave ever surfed in the history of the World Surf League.

Koxa surfed the wave on November 8, 2017, in the village of Nazaré, Oeste region of  Portugal.

In August 2010, Koxa had reached a previous record. In Chile, he surfed the largest wave ever seen in South America, estimated at more than  face, earning him the record of surfing the highest wave of South America.

See also 
 Nazaré, Portugal
 Praia do Norte (Nazaré)

References

External links 
 
 
 
 Rodrigo Koxa surfing in Nazaré, Portugal

1979 births
People from Jundiaí
Brazilian surfers
Big wave surfing
Living people
Sportspeople from São Paulo (state)